Joël de Almeida Pedro (born 10 April 1992) is a Luxembourger international footballer who plays for FC Swift Hesperange, as a midfielder.

Club career
Born in Luxembourg City, Pedro has played club football in France for Sedan B which he joined in 2011. In 2012, he moved to F91 Dudelange.

In June 2019, Pedro joined FC Swift Hesperange.

International career
He made his international debut for Luxembourg in 2009, and has appeared in FIFA World Cup qualifying matches.

References

1992 births
Living people
Luxembourgian footballers
Luxembourg international footballers
Luxembourgian people of Portuguese descent
CS Sedan Ardennes players
F91 Dudelange players
Jeunesse Esch players
FC Swift Hesperange players
Luxembourgian expatriate footballers
Expatriate footballers in France
Luxembourgian expatriate sportspeople in France
Association football midfielders